The U.S. state of Oregon first required its residents to register their motor vehicles in 1905. Registrants provided their own license plates for display until 1911, when the state began to issue plates.

, plates are issued by the Oregon Department of Transportation through its Driver & Motor Vehicle Services branch. Front and rear plates are required for most classes of vehicles, while only rear plates are required for motorcycles and trailers.

Passenger baseplates

1911 to 1949
No slogans were used on passenger plates during the period covered by this subsection.

1950 to present

The 1955 (dated 1956) issue was the first Oregon license plate that complied with these standards.

All plates from 1955 until present are still valid, provided they are displayed on the vehicle to which they were originally issued and the vehicle has been continuously registered.

Optional plates

There are also special plates available for special interest vehicles, antique vehicles, veterans, and various service clubs.

Non-passenger plates

References

External links

Current Oregon Regular-Issue License Plates from Oregon Department of Transportation
Oregon license plates, 1969–present
Oregon Vehicle License Plate Manual from Oregon Department of Transportation
License Plate News & Highs
Portland Trail Blazers license plate

Oregon
Transportation in Oregon
Oregon transportation-related lists
Oregon culture